KF Pirust is an Albanian professional football club based in Tirana. They are currently competing in the Kategoria e Tretë.

See also
List of football clubs in Albania

References

Pirust